Westwood is a tram stop on the Oldham and Rochdale Line (ORL) of the Manchester Metrolink and serves the Westwood area of Oldham, in Greater Manchester, England. The stop opened on 27 January 2014.

The tram stop is a 15-minute walk away from Oldham Athletic Football Club.

Service pattern 

References

External links

Westwood stop information
Westwood Metrolink stop map

Tram stops in the Metropolitan Borough of Oldham
Tram stops on the East Didsbury to Rochdale line
Railway stations in Great Britain opened in 2014
2014 establishments in England